Escadrille Spa.68 (originally Escadrille N.68) was a French fighter squadron active from Autumn 1915 until the Armistice that ended World War I. It was equipped with a mixed lot of Nieuports until they were gradually replaced by SPADs in November 1917. The squadron was one of four bundled into Groupe de Combat 20 in February 1918. By war's end, Escadrille Spa.68 was credited with the destruction of 15 enemy aircraft.

History
Escadrille Spa.68 was founded as Escadrille N.68. It was one of two early aviation units attached to the Cavalry Corps when it was supplied with Nieuports during September 1915. Equipment was a mixture of Nieuport 12s, Nieuport 16s, and Nieuport 27s.

By early 1917, it was attached to VIII Armee. It would spend the year with a steady turnover of aircraft types until it stabilized on SPAD S.7s and SPAD XIIs in November. Once outfitted with SPADs, the squadron was redesignated Escadrille Spa.68.

Toward the end of February 1918, the squadron was one of four that were combined to form Groupe de Combat 20. The squadron would fight as part of this larger unit until war's end. By that time, Escadrille Spa.68 was credited with the destruction of 15 German aircraft.

Commanding officers
 Unknown: September 1915 - November 1916
 Capitaine Garde: November 1916 - Early 1917
 Capitaine Lemerle: Early 1917 - 16 June 1918
 Lieutenant Milliat: 16 June 1918 - war's end

Notable member
Lieutenant: Pierre Gaudermen

Aircraft

 Nieuports (type unknown): September 1915
 Early 1917 inventory:
 Nieuport 12s
 Nieuport 16s
 Nieuport 27s
 SPAD S.7s begin to arrive: March 1917
 June 1917 inventory:
 SPAD S.7s
 Nieuport 24s
 August 1917 inventory:
 SPADs (type unknown)
 Nieuport 24s
 November 1917 inventory:
 SPAD S.7s
 SPAD S.12

End notes

Reference
 Franks, Norman; Bailey, Frank (1993). Over the Front: The Complete Record of the Fighter Aces and Units of the United States and French Air Services, 1914–1918 London, UK: Grub Street Publishing. .

Fighter squadrons of the French Air and Space Force
Military units and formations established in 1915
Military units and formations disestablished in 1918
Military units and formations of France in World War I
Military aviation units and formations in World War I